Cavelti is a surname. Notable people with the surname include:
 Bruno Cavelti (born 1961), Swiss gymnast
 Elsa Cavelti (1907–2001), Swiss opera singer

Surnames of Swiss origin